Chipping may refer to:

Places

England
It was sometimes historically spelled Chepying.

 Chipping, Hertfordshire
 Chipping, Lancashire
 Chipping Barnet, Greater London (formerly Hertfordshire)
 Chipping Campden, Gloucestershire
 Chipping Norton, Oxfordshire
 Chipping Ongar, Essex
 Chipping Sodbury, Gloucestershire
 Chipping Steps, Tetbury, Gloucestershire
 Chipping Warden, Northamptonshire
 Chepping Wycombe, Buckinghamshire

Elsewhere
 Chipping Norton, New South Wales, a suburb of Sydney in Australia

Other uses
 Chipping (rock climbing)
 Chipping, chip tuning a car's ECU system
 Chipping, installing a modchip into a game console
 Chipping, using a woodchipper
 Chipping, being a chipper (tobacco), or occasional drugs user
 Chipping, a method of propagating plant bulbs, linked to twin-scaling
 Chipping, the process of inserting a microchip implant (animal)
 Chipping potato, a potato variety well-suited to making potato chips
 Chip (golf), a type of golf shot
 Chipping, or chip coding, in telecommunications theory, a method for encoding signals with many diverse applications

See also

Chip (disambiguation)
Chipper (disambiguation)
Chippenham (disambiguation)
Loose chippings